Coon Run is a  long tributary to East Branch Oil Creek in Crawford County, Pennsylvania.

Course
Coon Run rises on the Brannon Run divide about 2 miles southeast of Glynden, Pennsylvania.  Coon Run then flows northwest through the Erie Drift Plain to East Branch Oil Creek at Glynden.

Watershed
Coon Run drains  of area, receives about 45.5 in/year of precipitation, has a topographic wetness index of 457.66 and is about 57% forested.

References

Additional Maps

Rivers of Pennsylvania
Rivers of Crawford County, Pennsylvania